The garrucha is a small pistol, similar to a derringer, common in Brazil and Argentina in the early 20th century.  It is usually double-barreled, though with the barrels side-by-side rather than vertical as is common in American derringers, and the bores can be rifled or smooth.

In Brazil, the most popular chamberings were for the .320 and .380 centerfire cartridges, similar to the .32 S&W and .38 S&W in appearance, but conical.  They were also chambered for the .22 Short, .22 Long, .22 Long Rifle, and the .32, 8mm, and 9mm Flobert cartridges, among others.

These types of pistols were popular from 1930 to 1960 due to their low cost and small size, and were associated with the gauchos (cowboys) of the South American Pampas.

In Brazil, Garruchas were produced by Castelo, Rossi, and Lerap.

See also
Derringer
Howdah pistol

References

Further reading
Belgian Garrucha Pistol & Garden Guns on Curator's Corner, NRA Blog, January 12, 2012, 19:03

Handguns
Firearms of Brazil
Multiple-barrel firearms
Firearm terminology
.22 LR firearms
Derringers